Martin Francis Domres (born April 17, 1947) is a former American collegiate and professional football player. From Columbia University, he was drafted in the first round of the Common Draft as a  quarterback by the American Football League (AFL)'s San Diego Chargers. Rarely seeing action behind John Hadl during his three years with the Chargers, Domres requested a trade and was acquired by the Baltimore Colts for John Andrews and a 1973 first-round pick (25th overall–Johnny Rodgers) on August 7, 1972. He replaced Johnny Unitas as the starting quarterback beginning in Week 6 of the 1972 campaign after John Sandusky succeeded Don McCafferty as head coach and was ordered by general manager Joe Thomas to bench the veterans in favor of the younger players. Domres played in nine professional football seasons from 1969 to 1977 for four teams.

See also
 Other American Football League players

Reference

External links

 Marty Domres (statistics & history) – Pro-Football-Reference.com.
 Marty Domres (profile) – Syracuse Hall of Fame.
 Marty Domres (profile) – Columbia University Athletics.
 Klingaman, Mike. "Catching Up With...Former Colt Marty Domres," The Toy Department (The Baltimore Sun sports blog), Tuesday, July 28, 2009.

1947 births
Living people
Sportspeople from Ithaca, New York
Players of American football from New York (state)
American football quarterbacks
San Diego Chargers players
Baltimore Colts players
San Francisco 49ers players
New York Jets players
Columbia Lions football players
American Football League players